Sayed Ali Babaci (born 12 March 1915, date of death unknown) was an Afghan field hockey player, who competed at the 1936 Summer Olympic Games and played in both games.

References

External links
 

1915 births
Year of death missing
Afghan male field hockey players
Field hockey players at the 1936 Summer Olympics
Olympic field hockey players of Afghanistan